The 2012 San Luis Potosí Challenger was a professional tennis tournament played on clay courts. It was the 19th edition of the tournament which was part of the 2012 ATP Challenger Tour. It took place in San Luis Potosí, Mexico between 2 and 8 April 2012.

Singles main draw entrants

Seeds

 1 Rankings are as of March 19, 2012.

Other entrants
The following players received wildcards into the singles main draw:
  Luis Patino
  Miguel Angel Reyes-Varela
  Bruno Rodríguez
  Manuel Sanchez

The following players received entry from the qualifying draw:
  Júlio César Campozano
  Mauricio Echazú
  Andrej Martin
  Denis Zivkovic

The following player received entry as a lucky loser into the singles main draw:
  Fabiano de Paula

Champions

Singles

 Rubén Ramírez Hidalgo def.  Paolo Lorenzi 3–6, 6–3, 6–4

Doubles

 Nicholas Monroe /  Simon Stadler def.  Andre Begemann /  Jordan Kerr 3–6, 7–5, [10–7]

External links
ITF Search
ATP official site

San Luis Potosi Challenger
San Luis Potosí Challenger